Ryan Carrassi (born August 1, 1971) is an Italian voice actor, score composer, film producer, screenwriter, song-writer, talent scout, writer and journalist. His credits as a screenwriter include Sunset Beach.

Career
Ryan Carrassi, (real name Nicola Carrassi), was born in Italy. His family moved to London in 1974. In 1987, at 14, he began his career as voice actor, in English language for Tv commercial, in Italian language for animation Tv Show.
In 1999 moved to Hollywood, California, and changed his name to the more American sounding Ryan Carrassi. He wrote storylines for the Aaron Spelling TV series Sunset Beach, and for award winning daytime shows like Days of Our Lives and Passions. In Hollywood, he worked as producer and consultant for television broadcasters and US content producers.

References

External links

 

1971 births
Italian film producers
Italian male voice actors
Italian screenwriters
Living people
Male television composers
Television composers
Italian voice directors
Italian male screenwriters